John Stanley Bartley, A.S.C. (born February 12, 1947), often credited as John S. Bartley, is a New Zealand-born American cinematographer best known for his work on television series such as Lost, Bates Motel and The X Files and feature films such as The X Files: I Want to Believe and The Chronicles of Riddick.

Bartley was raised in Wellington, where he didn't get to watch television until his early teens, and even then only one channel was broadcasting in New Zealand. In an interview he said that National Velvet and The Bridge on the River Kwai were two of his favorite films when he was young.

In 1995, Bartley received his first Emmy Award nomination in the category "Outstanding Individual Achievement in Cinematography for a Series" for The X-Files episode "One Breath". He lost the award to Tim Suhrstedt for Chicago Hope. Bartley was nominated the following year for The X Files episode "Grotesque",  in the same category, and won the award. Bartley was also nominated for an Emmy in the Outstanding Cinematography For A One Hour Series category for the Lost episode "The Constant."

Filmography

As cinematographer or director of photography

Films
 Grand Unified Theory (2016)
 Hunting Season (2013)
 Innocent (2011)
 17th Precinct (2011)
 The X Files: I Want to Believe (2008)
 The Prince of Motor City (2008)
 Gray Matters (2006)
 Odd Girl Out (2005)
 The Nickel Children (2005)
 Naughty or Nice (2004)
 The Chronicles of Riddick (2004)
 Alien Lockdown (2004)
 Wrong Turn (2003)
 Then Came Jones (2003)
 Spinning Boris (2003)
 Eight Legged Freaks (2002)
 The Matthew Shepard Story (2002)
 Another Life (2002)
 Black River (2001)
 See Spot Run (2001)
 HRT (2001)
 Where the Money Is (2000)
 A Cooler Climate (1999)
 Masters of Horror and Suspense (1999)
 A Feeling Called Glory (1999)
 Disturbing Behavior (1998)
 Tricks (1997)
 Echo (1997)
 The X-Files: The Unopened File (1996)
 Beyond Betrayal (1994)
 Another Stakeout (1993)
 Jumpin' Joe (1992)
 Home Movie (1992)
 Yes Virginia, There Is a Santa Claus (1991)
 Sky High (1990)
 Beyond the Stars (1989)

Television
 Wu Assassins (2019)
 10 episodes
 Insomnia (2018)
 8 episodes
 The Good Doctor (2017-2018)
 9 episodes
 iZombie (2015)
 pilot
 Bates Motel (2013)
 45 episodes
 Vikings (2013)
 9 episodes
 Charlie's Angels (2011)
 2 episodes
 Dragon Age: Redemption (2011)
 6 episodes
 Undercovers (2010-2011)
 6 episodes  
 Lost (2005-2010)
 51 episodes
 Glory Days (2002)
 9 episodes
 Roswell (1999)
 4 episodes
 The X files (1993-1996)
 62 episodes
 The Commish (1991-1993)
 44 episodes
 Broken Badges (1991)
 3 episodes
 21 Jump Street (1990-1991)
 8 episodes  
 Booker (1990)
 12 episodes
 Wiseguy (1990)
 2 episodes

As other crew
 The Room Upstairs (1987)
 Backfire (1987)
 The Boy Who Could Fly (1986)
 Love Is Never Silent (1985)
 Picking Up the Pieces (1985)
 Love, Mary (1985)
 The Journey of Natty Gann (1985)
 The Glitter Dome (1984)
 The Three Wishes of Billy Grier (1984)
 Secrets of a Married Man (1984)
 Spacehunter: Adventures in the Forbidden Zone (1983)
 Packin' It In (1983)
 A Piano for Mrs. Cimino (1982)
 The Babysitter (1980)
 Mr. Patman (1980)
 Bear Island (1979)
 Who'll Save Our Children? (1978)

References

External links
 
 
 John Bartley talks about his work Lost

Living people
Emmy Award winners
New Zealand emigrants to the United States
1947 births